The 2014 Gloucester City Council election took place on 22 May 2014 to elect members of Gloucester City Council in England. This was on the same day as other local elections. Fifteen of the 36 seats on the council were up for election, representing a nominal third of the council. No seats changed party, and so the council remained under no overall control, with the Conservatives having exactly half the seats on the council. The Conservative leader, Paul James, continued to serve as leader of the council after the election.

Results
The overall results were as follows:

|}

Ward results
The results in each ward were as follows (candidates with an asterisk* were the previous incumbent standing for re-election):

References

2014 English local elections
2014
2010s in Gloucestershire